Capillicornis basilaris is a species of beetle in the family Cerambycidae, and the only species in the genus Capillicornis. It was described by Galileo and Martins in 2012. It is known from Ecuador.

References

Desmiphorini
Beetles described in 2012
Monotypic Cerambycidae genera